The 1907 Illinois Fighting Illini football team was an American football team that represented the University of Illinois during the 1907 college football season.  In their second non-consecutive season under head coach Arthur R. Hall, the Illini compiled a 3–2 record and finished in third place in the Western Conference. Halfback Lion Gardiner was the team captain.

Schedule

References

Illinois
Illinois Fighting Illini football seasons
Illinois Fighting Illini football